The 1991 European Junior Badminton Championships was the 12th tournament of the European Junior Badminton Championships. It was held in Budapest, Hungary, from 31 March to 6th of April. Danish players won four titles girls' singles, and all the three doubles disciplines while Austria won Boys' singles and Soviet Union won the mixed team championships.

Medalists

Results

Semi-finals

Finals

Medal table

References 

European Junior Badminton Championships
European Junior Badminton Championships
European Junior Badminton Championships
European Junior Badminton Championships
International sports competitions hosted by Hungary